Gbablasso is a village in western Ivory Coast. It is in the sub-prefecture of Biankouma, Biankouma Department, Tonkpi Region, Montagnes District.

Gbablasso was a commune until March 2012, but it, along with 1125 other communes nationwide, were abolished.

Notes

Former communes of Ivory Coast
Populated places in Montagnes District
Populated places in Tonkpi